John William Carr (10 June 1926 – 13 December 1996) was a professional footballer who played as a winger for Huddersfield Town. He was born and died in Durban, South Africa.

References

Sources
 99 Years & Counting – Stats & Stories – Huddersfield Town History

1926 births
1996 deaths
South African people of British descent
Association football wingers
Huddersfield Town A.F.C. players
Sportspeople from Durban
Expatriate footballers in England
South African soccer players
English Football League players